Helle Møller Jespersen (born 12 February 1968) is a Danish competitive sailor and Olympic medalist. She won a silver medal in the Yngling class at the 2004 Summer Olympics in Athens, together with Dorte Jensen and Christina Otzen.

References

External links

1968 births
Living people
Danish female sailors (sport)
Sailors at the 2004 Summer Olympics – Yngling
Olympic sailors of Denmark
Olympic bronze medalists for Denmark
Olympic medalists in sailing
Medalists at the 2004 Summer Olympics